Duronto  may refer to:

Duronto TV, a Bangladeshi television channel for children
Duronto Express, an Indian Railways train service
Duronto Rajshahi, a Bangladeshi cricket team